Asharambari is one of the 60 Legislative Assembly constituencies of Tripura state in India. It is part of Khowai district and is reserved for candidates belonging to the Scheduled Tribes. It is also part of East Tripura Lok Sabha constituency.

Members of Legislative Assembly
 1972: Nripen Chakraborty, Communist Party of India (Marxist)
 1977: Bidya Debbarma, Communist Party of India (Marxist)
 1983: Bidya Debbarma, Communist Party of India (Marxist)
 1988: Bidya Debbarma, Communist Party of India (Marxist)
 1993: Bidya Debbarma, Communist Party of India (Marxist)
 1998: Sandhya Rani Debbarma, Communist Party of India (Marxist)
 2003: Sachindra Debbarma, Communist Party of India (Marxist)
 2008: Sachindra Debbarma, Communist Party of India (Marxist)
 2013: Aghore Debbarma, Communist Party of India (Marxist)

Election results

2018

See also
List of constituencies of the Tripura Legislative Assembly
 Khowai district
 Tripura East (Lok Sabha constituency)

References

Khowai district
Assembly constituencies of Tripura